This is a list of state parks and state historic sites in Missouri. In the U.S. state of Missouri both state parks and state historic sites are administered by the Division of State Parks of the Missouri Department of Natural Resources.

State parks

State historic sites

See also
List of U.S. national parks

References

External links 

Missouri State Parks and Historic Sites Missouri Department of Natural Resources
Missouri State Parks - List of Parks and Historic Sites Missouri Department of Natural Resources

 
Missouri state parks